Unremembered  is an album composed by Sarah Kirkland Snider which "sets poetry by New-York-based poet/writer Nathaniel Bellows, recalling strange and beautiful happenings experienced during a childhood in rural Massachusetts."

It features the vocals of Shara Nova, DM Stith, and Padma Newsom.

Track listing
All tracks composed by Sarah Kirkland Snider with lyrics by Nathaniel Bellows.

 "Prelude" – 2:43
 "The Estate" – 3:35
 "The Barn" – 4:25
 "The Guest" – 4:44
 "The Slaughterhouse" – 4:45
 "The Girl" – 2:53
 "The Swan" – 3:58
 "The Witch" – 6:30
 "The River" – 3:43
 "The Speakers" – 3:54
 "The Orchard" – 4:15
 "The Song" - 3:35
 "The Past" - 5:42

Personnel 
The personnel are as follows.

Conductor:

 Edwin Outwater

Vocals: 

 Padma Newsome
 Shara Nova 
 DM Stith

Oboe:

 Kathy Halvorson
 Hassan Anderson on "The Slaughterhouse" and "The Past"

English Horn:

 Slava Znatchenii
 Lauren Blackerby on "The Slaughterhouse" and "The Past"

Bassoon:

 Mike Parker Harley
 Damian Primis
 Brent Foster on "The Past"
 Allison Nicotera on "The Past"

French Horn:

 Matt Marks
 Chad Yarbrough

Percussion:

 Eric Beach
 Thomas Kozumplik
 Jason Treuting
 Lawson White

Melodica:

 Lawson White

Harp:

 Nuiko Wadden

Piano:

 Timo Andres

References

External links 
 Official Page
 Sarah Kirkland Snider
 New Amsterdam Records

2015 albums